Stojan Osojnak (1923-2016) was a Croatian football player and manager.

Career 
Osojnak played for Rijeka and Dinamo Zagreb in the 1940s and 1950s. He is considered as the most notable football player from Opatija, and one of the five greatest forwards in the early history of HNK Rijeka (along with Bruno Veselica, Miodrag Kustudić, Milan Radović and Tonči Gulin).

Osojnak was also notable for appearing in the first ever match played by Dinamo Zagreb on 23 June 1945, a friendly game against the Yugoslav Air Force team played in Zagreb. However, Osojnak was dropped from the squad before the club started competing in post-war championships and he did not appear for the club in competitive matches in the following seasons.

Between the late 1940s and early 1950s he had his first spell at NK Rijeka (named "NK Kvarner" at the time) and scored 45 league goals for the club in the period from 1949 and 1953. In 1953 he was signed by Dinamo Zagreb and this time he appeared in 22 league matches and scored 11 goals over the next three Yugoslav First League seasons, appearing alongside other Dinamo greats such as Željko Čajkovski, Tomislav Crnković, Dionizije Dvornić, Vladimir Čonč and Luka Lipošinović. He is mainly remembered for his performances in the title-winning 1953–54 season, in which he scored 9 goals in 10 league appearances for the Blues, including the crucial goal against Red Star Belgrade at Maksimir on 25 April 1954, which sealed Dinamo's second championship triumph.

In 1955 he returned to Rijeka and played there until his retirement in 1959, scoring 26 goals for the club in his last four playing seasons. After retiring from active football, Osojnak started working as manager and had three managing spells at NK Rijeka (1960–1961, 1962–1963 with Angelo Zikovich and 1964–1967), his greatest achievements being finishing 4th in the Yugoslav championship in 1964–65 and 1965–66.

He also had managing spells at several clubs in Switzerland, including FC Sion (1967–1968, replacing his former Dinamo teammate Lev Mantula) and FC Chiasso (1969–1970 and 1993).

Death
Osojnak died in Switzerland, aged 93. He was reputed to be the oldest living Dinamo player at the time of his death and was 'succeeded' by then 91-year old Željko Čajkovski.

Honours
NK Rijeka
Yugoslav Second League: 1952, 1957–58

Dinamo Zagreb
Yugoslav First League: 1953–54

References

External links
Short article about Osojnak at Jutarnji list 
Stojan Osojnak

1923 births
2016 deaths
People from Opatija
Footballers from Rijeka
Italian people of Croatian descent
Association football forwards
Italian footballers
Yugoslav footballers
NK Opatija players
HNK Rijeka players
GNK Dinamo Zagreb players
Yugoslav First League players
Italian football managers
Yugoslav football managers
Croatian football managers
HNK Rijeka managers
FC Sion managers
FC Chiasso managers
Yugoslav expatriate football managers
Expatriate football managers in Switzerland
Yugoslav expatriate sportspeople in Switzerland
Italian expatriate football managers
Croatian expatriate football managers
Croatian expatriate sportspeople in Switzerland